Ikaw Sana (International title: To Love You / ) is a Philippine television drama romance series broadcast by GMA Network. Directed by Joel Lamangan, it stars Jennylyn Mercado, Mark Herras and Pauleen Luna. It premiered on September 21, 2009 on the network's Telebabad line up replacing All My Life. The series concluded on February 5, 2010 with a total of 100 episodes. It was replaced by First Time in its timeslot.

Cast and characters

Lead cast
 Jennylyn Mercado as Eliza Garcia / Eliza Montemayor-Olivarez
 Mark Herras as Michael Olivarez
 Pauleen Luna as Sofia Reyes / Montemayor-Olivarez

Supporting cast
 Tirso Cruz III as Gener Montemayor
 Maritoni Fernandez as Loreta Reyes-Montemayor
 Marissa Delgado as Amanda Montemayor
 Mariz Ricketts as Sonia Garcia
 Tony Mabesa as Ramon Olivarez
 Luz Valdez as Chabeng Mendez-Garcia
 Alicia Alonzo as Mameng
 Vaness del Moral as Lucia Mendez
 Arthur Solinap as Dave Arnaiz
 Vivo Ouano as Bobby
 Jana Roxas as Charlene
 Jim Pebanco
 Joey Paras as Afi

Guest cast
 Camille Prats as Giselle
 Zoren Legaspi as Enrico Sta. Maria
 Frank Garcia as Luis
 Alliyah Fatima Dela Riva as Nina
 Byron Ortile as Georgie Lorenzo
 Sandy Talag as young Eliza
 Miguel Tanfelix as young Michael
 Charlotte Hermoso as young Sofia
 Jace Flores as Carlo Arellano
 Pinky Marquez as Sylvia Arellano
 Gabriela Joson as Baby Nina
 Richard Quan as Chen
 Harlene Bautista-Sarmenta as Jane

Ratings
According to AGB Nielsen Philippines' Mega Manila household television ratings, the pilot episode of Ikaw Sana earned a 16% rating. While the final episode scored a 21.1% rating.

Accolades

References

External links
 

2009 Philippine television series debuts
2010 Philippine television series endings
Filipino-language television shows
GMA Network drama series
Philippine romance television series
Television shows set in the Philippines